David Mair may refer to:
 David Mair (artificial track luger) (born 1984), Italian artificial track luger
 David Mair (natural track luger and skeleton racer) (born 1980), Italian natural track luger and skeleton racer
Dave Mair, 1973 CFL Draft

See also
David Mayer (disambiguation)
David Meyer (disambiguation)